Brother I'm Dying, published in 2007 by Alfred A. Knopf, is a family memoir by novelist Edwidge Danticat. In 2007, the title won the National Book Critics Circle Award and was also nominated for the National Book Award.

Background
Edwidge Danticat is a contemporary author of Haitian heritage. She was born on January 19, 1969, in Port-au-Prince, Haiti to a cab driver and a seamstress. By the time Danticat was four years of age, both of her parents had immigrated to New York City to seek the American Dream. After Danticat and her younger brother were left in Haiti by her parents, she was raised by her uncle and his wife.  Not knowing if she would ever see her parents again, they finally sent for her and her sibling when she was twelve years old to join them in New York. In 2002, she married Faidherbe Boyer and had two daughters.

Plot
“Brother, I'm Dying” is an autobiography narrative that begins in the country of Haiti and eventually ends in the United States. The author, and main character Edwidge Danticat, was born in Haiti in 1969. At the age of four she was left to be raised by her uncle while her parents moved to the United States on a work visa to pursue economic opportunities. It wasn't until the age of twelve that she able to be reunited with her family. She falls in love, marries, and eventually has a child. Edwidge's father becomes terminally ill and she decides to write her family's life story so that it can be shared with relatives that are still living in Haiti.

Style
"Brother, I'm Dying" is an autobiography and memoir about a family and political history. The first-person plot features flashbacks throughout the book. The protagonist, who is also the author, goes from looking at past events to future events. She wrote a collection of facts from history that referenced official documents, memories, and story woven from past to present, to create a cohesive whole.

This is a vivid sort of memoir, influenced by the author's fiction writing.

Character
Edwidge Danticat is a Haitian Native.  She was born and raised in Haiti. Her father and mother left Haiti to move to the United States when Edwidge was just a toddler. She was cared for by her Uncle Joseph and Aunt Denise. In 2002, she moved to the United States and married her husband.  Shortly a few years later she received some happy and devastating news at the same time.  Edwidge found out she was expecting her first child which she was ecstatic.  Later on that day she discovered her father was in his last stage of pulmonary fibrosis.  Her father cannot communicate  with his brother in Haiti, so she decided to record their story before her father demise.

Publication history

Themes

Haiti
 Haiti is known as a poor country, constantly struck by natural disasters. As one photographer experienced, Haitians believe their country is so much more beautiful than broken.

Immigration
 An issue that often arises when dealing with immigration is communication. Danticat is left in Haiti after her father Mira emigrates to the United States. The lack of secondary communication creates an emotional hardship for Danticat when her letter communication with Mira lacks emotion and feeling. Lack of emotional attachment to her father will not begin to heal until she is able to emigrate to the US to be with her parents several years later. Immigration into a new country is a difficult experience and can be especially difficult when the whole family is not able to migrate at the same time.
 Transnational parenting is a common struggle faced by American immigrants. Parents move to America, then they spend most of their time working hard and saving every penny. Their hopes are to quickly reunite their family, but it often takes years.
 In Edwidge Danticat's book, she explains the struggles of an immigrant. In an interview, Danticat described how immigrants received mistreatment and abuse during her time. This was because of the people in charge of the immigrant policies. They thought that they were protecting their country, and did whatever they wanted to the immigrants. Because of this, Immigrants were being persecuted because it was normal for people to abuse them.
American Dream
 According to Amelia Iuvino, immigrants who are coming from other countries in search of the American dream find it difficult to accommodate other ways of life. Sometimes having luxury things or more money is not enough to be happy. Not everybody has the opportunity to achieve the American dream; some people have more access to education and jobs than others. Some immigrants, who do not have the same opportunity to study in a specific field, cannot get a good job and make a considerable amount of money when most of the companies require a high level of education and experience on it.
Krome Service Processing Center
 The Krome site was originally cleared to build a missile base in the 1960s during the Cold War. In the early 1980s after a large immigration of Cubans and Haitians, the site was converted by the Army Corps of Engineers to be a “turn-around facility” for illegal immigrants.  Even though the site wasn't created for long-term housing, from its conception immigrants were being held there for undefined periods.
 Krome Service Processing Center have been in the news several times over the years.  Back in 1996, New York Times published an article about Immigration and Naturalization employees attempted to mislead an assembly of House members about the issues they were having at the location.  The House members were investigation allegations about the overcrowding and security issues the facility was having. 
 After a yearlong investigation conducted by the Justice Department's Inspector general, Michael R Bromwich the department found the facility agents to hide the fact they had an overcrowding issue released 58 detainees some with criminal records and relocated 45 detainees to another detention center in New Orleans.
 In his executive summary from Mr. Bromwich he stated, “The conduct of these officials in the context of the Congressional visit and during the course of the investigation is very disturbing, all the more so since the most egregious conduct was committed by persons in positions of substantial responsibility and leadership.”
 The facility may have deceived the delegation which came to see the facility back in 1995, with showing a facility being a well ran institution, however thanks to the honesty of employees at the facility sending a letter to the delegates informing them of the deception.

Healthcare
 Restrictions on healthcare over one's immigration status are claimed to violate a physicians’ “ethical responsibility to care for persons in medical need.” This issue is highlighted by the presumption that "clerks will probably screen patients for their immigration status, just as they currently screen them for their insurance status." As it is not uncommon for people to be denied care by hospitals due to insurance status, it would be reasonable to assume that the same would occur for those without proof of U.S. citizenship.

Reception
"Brother, I'm Dying", was named a Top 10 African-American Non-fiction book by Booklist in 2008.

Entertainment Weekly gave "Brother, I'm Dying" a B+.

Positive reviews from Library Journal, Booklist, and Publishers Weekly.

References

External links

2007 non-fiction books
Books about writers
Novels set in Haiti
Novels set in New York City
Alfred A. Knopf books
National Book Critics Circle Award-winning works